This is a partial list of Ukrainian bandura ensembles, sorted by their home country, and linked to the groups' web sites.

See also Kobzarstvo.

Argentina 
 Taras Shevchenko Bandurist Capella

Australia 
Hnat Khotkevych Bandurist Ensemble (Sydney)
Lesia Ukrainka Bandurist Ensemble (Melbourne)
Hryhory Kytasty Bandurist Ensemble (Adelaide)
Vodohray Bandura Ensemble (Adelaide)
S.o.V (Adelaide)
Mykola Lysenko Bandurist Ensemble (Canberra)
Lastivka (Sydney)
Koloryt (Melbourne)

Canada 

Canadian Bandurist Capella
Hnat Khotkevych Bandurist Ensemble
Barvinok
Khvyli Dnipra Bandurist Ensemble
Kobzari
Hryhory Kytasty Bandurist Capella

Czechoslovakia 
 Prague Bandurist Capella

Germany 
Leontovych Bandura Chorus
 Ostap Veresai Brotherhood

Russia 
Moscow Bandurist Capella
Leningrad Bandurist Capella
Kuban Bandurist Capella
Rostov Bandurist Capella

Ukraine 

Poltava Bandurist Capella
Combined Bandurist Capella
Kiev Bandurist Capella
 Lviv Bandurist Capella
 Poltava Women's Bandurist Capella
 Strytiv Bandurist Capella
 Lviv folk ensemble of bandura players 
 Ukrainian Cappella Bandura Players
 Tcharivny Srtouny. Magical Strings & Voices of Ukraine
 B&B Project

United Kingdom 
Selo
Kobzarske bratstvo

United States 
Experimental Bandura Trio
New York Bandura Ensemble
Ukrainian Bandurist Chorus
 Women's Bandura Ensemble of North America
Homin Stepiv

Kobzarstvo
Ukrainian choirs
Bandura ensembles